Karel Černý  (born 1 February 1910, date of death unknown)  was a Czech football defender who was a member of the Czechoslovakia national team at the 1938 FIFA World Cup. However, he never earned a cap for the national team. At club level, he played for various clubs, most notably SK Slavia Prague, where he won three consecutive league championships in the 1939–40, 1940–41 and 1941–42 seasons.

References

External links
FIFA profile

1910 births
Year of death missing
Czechoslovak footballers
Association football defenders
FC Zbrojovka Brno players
FC Viktoria Plzeň players
SK Slavia Prague players
1938 FIFA World Cup players